"Ghost of Love" is a radio single released exclusively in Finland by Finnish alternative rock band The Rasmus, and the third track on their 2008 studio album Black Roses. It was written by lead-singer Lauri Ylönen.

Band line-up
 Lauri Ylönen – vocals
 Pauli Rantasalmi – guitar
 Eero Heinonen – bass
 Aki Hakala – drums

References

External links
 Lyrics

The Rasmus songs
2009 songs
Songs written by Desmond Child
Songs written by Lauri Ylönen
Song recordings produced by Desmond Child
Songs written by Harry Sommerdahl
Songs written by Pauli Rantasalmi